The Bellingham Roller Betties is a women's flat track roller derby league based in Bellingham, Washington. Founded in 2006, Bellingham is a member of the Women's Flat Track Derby Association (WFTDA).

History and structure
Founded in November 2006, the Betties had more than thirty members by the following March.  The league joined the Women's Flat Track Derby Association (WFTDA) in 2009.  In 2011, it competed in the Dust Devil tournament. The league currently consists of three teams, and a mixed team which competes against teams from other leagues.

Rankings

References

Bellingham, Washington
Roller derby leagues established in 2006
Roller derby leagues in Washington (state)
2006 establishments in Washington (state)